Kani may refer to:
 Kani, Hormozgan (كاني - Kānī)
 Kani, Khuzestan (كني - Kanī)
 Kani, Kurdistan (كاني - Kānī)

See also
Kani is a common element in Iranian place names; see